Estádio Municipal Paulo Machado de Carvalho, colloquially known as Estádio do Pacaembu, is an Art Deco stadium in São Paulo, located in the Pacaembu neighborhood. The stadium is owned by the Municipal Prefecture of São Paulo. The stadium was inaugurated on 27 April 1940, in the presence of the Brazilian President Getúlio Vargas, the interventor Adhemar de Barros and the mayor of São Paulo, Prestes Maia. The stadium holds 40,199 people and its pitch dimensions are 104 m of length by 70 m of width.

The stadium is named after Paulo Machado de Carvalho. He was the 1958 FIFA World Cup Brazilian delegation chief, the founder of Rede Record, one of the largest television networks in Brazil and was known as "Marechal da Vitória" (Marshal of Victory).

Pacaembu is frequently used to host home matches of the Big 4 football clubs of the State of São Paulo, of which Corinthians, Palmeiras and São Paulo are based in the capital city itself, and only Santos is based in a different city. This occurs when the clubs must cede their own stadiums for concerts, or when reforms are being made. In the case of Santos, Pacaembu is also used when the club requires a site with a higher seating capacity for a particular match, given the low capacity of their own stadium.

History

The first match ever played at Pacaembu Stadium took place on 27 April 1940, when Palestra Itália (now known as SE Palmeiras) defeated Coritiba, 6-2. The first goal in the stadium was scored by Coritiba's Zequinha. Later that day, Corinthians beat Atlético Mineiro 4–2 on the same ground. Both matches were part of the Taça Cidade de São Paulo competition.

On 4 May 1940, the Taça Cidade de São Paulo Final was played at Pacaembu Stadium. Palestra Itália beat Corinthians 2–1, becoming the first club to win a competition at the stadium.

The stadium's attendance record currently stands at 71,281, set on 24 May 1942, when Corinthians and São Paulo drew 3–3.

On 20 September 1942, Palmeiras played its first match after changing its name from Palestra Itália. Palmeiras beat São Paulo 3–1, winning that year's Campeonato Paulista.

In 1945, São Paulo beat Jabaquara 12–1 at Pacaembu Stadium. This remains the highest-scoring match in the stadium's history.

In 2005, the stadium served as the first "Pit Stop" of The Amazing Race 9.

On 11 May 2007, Pope Benedict XVI met with the youth of Brazil at the stadium as a part of his Apostolic Journey to Brazil on the occasion of the Fifth General Conference of the Bishops of Latin America and the Caribbean.

Until the opening of Arena Corinthians in 2014, Corinthians played most of their home matches at Pacaembu, since their original stadium did not meet the requirements for hosting official football matches.

Between July 2010 and November 2014, the stadium was the temporary home ground of Palmeiras while Allianz Parque was under construction.

1950 FIFA World Cup
Six 1950 FIFA World Cup matches were played at Estádio do Pacaembu, which were:

Concerts

 Paul McCartney performed in front of 45,000 fans in 1993, during his New World Tour.
 On January 27, 28 and 30, 1995, the Rolling Stones performed three sold-out concerts at Pacaembu, to a total audience of 170,000 people.
 The Red Hot Chili Peppers performed at the stadium in 2002 on their By The Way Tour.
 Avril Lavigne's 2005 Bonez Tour made a stop here, in front of 40,000 fans.
 Eric Clapton performed in front of 60,000 fans in 2001, during his Reptile World Tour.
 Brazilian singer Roberto Carlos performed at the stadium in a 2001 concert.
 Heavy metal band Iron Maiden has made two stops at the venue: in 1996 and 2004.
 Pearl Jam performed at the stadium on December 2 and 3 in 2005 on their Pearl Jam 2005 North American/Latin American Tour in front of more than 80,000 fans.

Museum

On 29 September 2008, the Museu do Futebol (Museum of Football) was inaugurated. It was created to tell the history of Brazilian football. The 680 workers hired to build the museum completed the construction in 13 months.

References

Enciclopédia do Futebol Brasileiro, Volume 2 - Lance, Rio de Janeiro: Aretê Editorial S/A, 2001.

External links

Santos FC
Pacaembu (in Portuguese)
Inauguration (in Portuguese)

Football venues in São Paulo
1950 FIFA World Cup stadiums
Sports venues in São Paulo
Copa América stadiums
Pan American Games opening ceremony stadiums
Tourist attractions in São Paulo
Sports venues completed in 1940
1940 establishments in Brazil
Art Deco architecture in Brazil